Carlos Enrique Estrada Mosquera (born 1 November 1961) is a Colombian football forward who played for Colombia in the 1990 FIFA World Cup. He also played for Millonarios Fútbol Club.

References

External links
FIFA profile

1961 births
Living people
Colombian footballers
Colombia international footballers
1990 FIFA World Cup players
Association football forwards
Categoría Primera A players
Deportes Tolima footballers
Millonarios F.C. players
Deportivo Cali footballers
Independiente Medellín footballers
People from Tumaco
Sportspeople from Nariño Department
20th-century Colombian people